Debeljaci is a village in the municipality of Banja Luka, Republika Srpska, Bosnia and Herzegovina.

Debeljaci used to be inhabited largely by Croats until the outbreak of the Bosnian War.

Demographics
Ethnic groups in the village include:
1,155 Serbs (94.75%)
47 Croats (3.86%)
17 Others (1.40%)

References

Villages in Republika Srpska
Populated places in Banja Luka